The 2022 Western Premier League, also called the Burmac Western Premier League for sponsorship reasons, was the 22nd season of the Western Premier League (WPL), the top football league in the Central West region of New South Wales. It was the third consecutive year that the competition has run, following an eight-year hiatus. No title was awarded in 2021, following the abandonment of the competition one round before finals due to the COVID-19 pandemic.

The season saw the expansion of the competition to 11 teams with the addition of Bathurst 75 and Orange CYMS, who last competed in the 2008 and 2002 WPL season respectively. CYMS, who finished runners-up in three grand finals in 1997, 1999 and 2000, singled its intention to join the competition back in July, 2021. Bathurst 75 announced its intention to field a team for the 2022 season back in November, 2021. They are also the most successful team in WPL history with six titles.

The season kicked-off with the first round of games on 2–3 April, with a six-team finals series commencing on 3 September. Orange Waratahs were crowned champions, defeating Bathurst club Panorama 2–1 in the grand final. Waratahs striker Craig Sugden and Bathurst 75 forward Agieg Aluk shared the leading goal scorer trophy, finishing the regular season with 16 goals each, while Bathurst 75 midfielder Luke Mutton was named the season's best and fairest.

Teams

Home venues and locations

Personal and kits

Regular season

Ladder

Results

Finals series

Qualifying finals

Semi finals

Preliminary final

Grand final

Season statistics

Top goal scorers

Hat-tricks

Notes

References 

2022 in Australian soccer